The Delarof Islands (ca. ) are a group of small islands at the extreme western end of the Andreanof Islands group in the central Aleutian Islands, Alaska.  The Delarofs consist of 11 named islands: Amatignak, Gareloi, Ilak, Kavalga (Qavalĝa), Ogliuga (Aglaga), Skagul (Sxaĝulax̂), the Tag (Tagachaluĝis), Tanadak (Tanaadax̂), Ugidak (Qagan-tanax̂), Ulak, and Unalga (Unalĝa). 

The islands were named after the 18th century Greek explorer and first de facto Governor of Alaska, Evstratios Ioannou Delarof (Ευστράτιος Ιωάννου Ντελάρωφ).

These islands are separated from the remainder of the Andreanofs by Tanaga Pass to the east and from Amchitka and Semisopochnoi (the easternmost of the Rat Islands) by Amchitka Pass to the west.  All of these islands are managed as part of the Aleutian Islands Unit of the Alaska Maritime National Wildlife Refuge. The Delarof Islands together have a land area of 63.842 sq mi (165.349 km2). None of the islands are populated.

The Delarof Islands were named in 1836 by Captain Fyodor Petrovich Litke of the Imperial Russian Navy. He named them after Greek-born administrator Eustrate Ivanovich Delarof (also spelled Evstratii Ivanovich Delarov), who was the chief manager of the Shelikhov-Golikov Company (precursor of the Russian-American Company) from 1787 to 1791.

References

Other sources

Orth, Donald J.  1971.  Dictionary of Alaskan place names.  U.S. Geological Survey Professional Paper 567, 1083 pp.
Delarof Islands: Blocks 1134 thru 1137, Census Tract 1, Aleutians West Census Area, Alaska United States Census Bureau

External links
 

 
Andreanof Islands
Islands of Alaska
Islands of Unorganized Borough, Alaska